"All Tomorrow's Parties" is a song by the Velvet Underground and Nico, written by Lou Reed and released on the group's 1967 debut studio album, The Velvet Underground & Nico.

Inspiration for the song came from Reed's observation of Andy Warhol's clique—according to Reed, the song is "a very apt description of certain people at the Factory at the time. ... I watched Andy. I watched Andy watching everybody. I would hear people say the most astonishing things, the craziest things, the funniest things, the saddest things." In a 2006 interview Reed's bandmate John Cale stated: "The song was about a girl called Darryl, a beautiful petite blonde with three kids, two of whom were taken away from her."
The song was Andy Warhol's favorite by The Velvet Underground.

The song has notably lent its name to a music festival, a William Gibson novel, and a Yu Lik-wai film.

Recording
The song was recorded at Scepter Studios in Manhattan during April 1966. It features a piano motif played by Cale (initially written as an exercise) based largely on tone clusters. The repetitive keyboard part was inspired by the style of Cale's musician friend Terry Riley, with whom Cale had played in La Monte Young's mid 1960s group Theatre of Eternal Music. It was one of the first pop songs to make use of prepared piano (a chain of paper clips were intertwined with the piano strings to change their sounds). The song also features the ostrich guitar tuning by Reed, by which all of the guitar strings were tuned to D. Drummer Maureen Tucker plays tambourine and bass drum while guitarist Sterling Morrison plays bass, an instrument that he professed to hate, despite his proficiency as a bassist.

Nico provides lead vocals. The song was originally recorded with only one track of her vocals; they were later double-tracked for the final album version. Most versions of the album use this version of the song, though the initial 1987 CD release uses the original mix without the double-tracking.

Personnel
 Nico – double-tracked lead vocals
 Lou Reed – ostrich fretless electric guitar
 John Cale – prepared piano, viola
 Sterling Morrison – bass
 Maureen Tucker – bass drum, tambourine

Alternate versions

Ludlow Street Loft, July 1965
The earliest known recorded version of "All Tomorrow's Parties" was recorded on reel to reel tape by Lou Reed, John Cale and Sterling Morrison in a New York apartment loft on Ludlow Street. With Reed on acoustic guitar, the song displays a strong influence from the American folk music revival—particularly in Cale and Morrison's harmony vocals—which critic David Fricke suggests demonstrates Reed's fondness for Bob Dylan. This version, released on the Peel Slowly and See box set, is composed of multiple takes, which add up to a time of 18:26.

Single version, July 1966
An edited version of the song was released in July 1966 as a single with "I'll Be Your Mirror" as a B-side. The song cuts out about half of the studio version at just under three minutes. It did not chart.

This version later became available in 2002 on the "Deluxe Edition" of The Velvet Underground & Nico.

Other alternate versions
An anniversary reissue of the album included an "alternate single voice version" and an "alternate instrumental mix."

Japan version 

English new wave band Japan originally covered the song on their 1979 album Quiet Life. However, several months after the band split, a version of the song, remixed in 1981 by Steve Nye, was released as a single in February 1983. The song peaked at number 38 on the UK Singles Chart.

Releases 
The 7-inch single was released with the B-side "In Vogue", which originally also featured on the Quiet Life album. However, this version is a live version from Tokyo in March 1980, with the single stating that it was taken from the 1982 Assemblage Special Edition Cassette' (however, it was originally released on the Live in Tokyo EP in 1980). The 12-inch single features two B-sides, also live versions from Tokyo: "Deviation" and "Obscure Alternatives", both of which originally featured on the band's second album Obscure Alternatives''. A limited edition bonus 12-inch single "European Son" was also released.

A total of 4 differently labelled 12-inch singles were released and along with the 7-inch single, none of them correctly credited the producers as Simon Napier Bell and Japan. The 7-inch single and 3 versions of the 12-inch single credited Giorgio Moroder as the producer, whilst the other 12-inch single credited the producer as John Punter.

 Track listings 7": Hansa / HANSA 18 (UK) "All Tomorrow's Parties" (1983 Remix) – 3:32
 "In Vogue" (Live in Tokyo) – 6:1012": Hansa / HANSA 1218 (UK) "All Tomorrow's Parties" (1983 Extended Remix) – 5:15
 "Deviation" (Live in Tokyo) – 3:18
 "Obscure Alternatives" (Live in Tokyo) – 6:04Double 12": Hansa / HANSA 1218 (UK, Limited Edition) "All Tomorrow's Parties" (1983 Extended Remix) – 5:15
 "Deviation" (Live in Tokyo) – 3:18
 "Obscure Alternatives" (Live in Tokyo) – 6:04
 "European Son" (Extended Remix) – 5:33
 "Alien" – 4:59

 Personnel Japan David Sylvian – vocals
 Rob Dean – guitar
 Richard Barbieri – synthesizers
 Mick Karn – bass guitar, saxophone, backing vocals
Steve Jansen – drumsTechnical'''

 Keith Bessey – engineering
 Steve Nye – remixing
 David Shortt – design
 Fin Costello – photography

Charts

Other cover versions
Both Nico and Lou Reed have recorded solo versions of the song. Other artists who have covered it include Jun Togawa, Buffalo Tom, Bauhaus, Jeff Buckley, Icehouse, Nick Cave and the Bad Seeds, Tom Robinson, Simple Minds, Siouxsie and the Banshees, Rasputina, Kendra Smith, Japan, Bryan Ferry, June Tabor, Johnette Napolitano, Iron and Wine, Los Tres, Deerhoof, St. Vincent, and Hole.

References

The Velvet Underground songs
Nico songs
1966 debut singles
Psychedelic songs
Songs written by Lou Reed
1966 songs
Verve Records singles
1983 singles
Japan (band) songs
Hansa Records singles
Works for prepared piano